Kostiantyn Merkuriyovych Sytnyk (3 June 1926 – 22 July 2017) was a Ukrainian and Soviet scientist and academician, a member of the National Academy of Sciences of Ukraine who in 1970-2003 was director of the Botanic Institute of the National Academy of Sciences of Ukraine. Sytnyk also worked as a politician, and served as the Chairman of the Verkhovna Rada of the Ukrainian Soviet Socialist Republic from 1980 to 1985.

Sytnyk was born in Luhansk.

External links
 Profile at the NANU Botanic Institute
 Full biography

1926 births
2017 deaths
People from Luhansk
Ukrainian botanists
Communist Party of Ukraine (Soviet Union) politicians
People's Democratic Party (Ukraine) politicians
Republican Platform politicians
Members of the National Academy of Sciences of Ukraine
Soviet leaders of Ukraine
Recipients of the USSR State Prize
Recipients of the Order of Lenin
Recipients of the Order of Prince Yaroslav the Wise, 5th class
Recipients of the Order of Prince Yaroslav the Wise, 4th class
Chairmen of the Verkhovna Rada of the Ukrainian Soviet Socialist Republic
21st-century Ukrainian politicians
Laureates of the State Prize of Ukraine in Science and Technology
Laureates of the Honorary Diploma of the Verkhovna Rada of Ukraine